Mycobacterium gilvum is a species of the phylum Actinomycetota (Gram-positive bacteria with high guanine and cytosine content, one of the dominant phyla of all bacteria), belonging to the genus Mycobacterium.

Etymology: gilvum, Latin for pale yellow.

Description
Pleomorphic gram-positive, nonmotile and acid-fast rods.

Colony characteristics
Pale yellow, Scotochromogenic, and smooth pleomorphic colonies.

Physiology
Rapid growth on Löwenstein-Jensen medium at 25 °C and 37 °C, but not at 45 °C, within 7 days.
Resistant to isoniazid, rifampicin, and sodium aminosalicylate.

Differential characteristics
5 species-specific antigens, demonstrable in immunodiffusion tests.

Pathogenesis
Not assumed to be pathogenic.
Biosafety level 1

Type strain
First isolated from sputum and pleura fluid (London).
Strain ATCC 43909 = CCUG 37676 = CIP 106743 = DSM 44503 = JCM 6395 = NCTC 10742.

References

Stanford,J., G. Gunthorpe. 1971. A study of some fast-growing scotochromogenic mycobacteria including species descriptions of Mycobacterium gilvum (new species) and Mycobacterium duvalii (new species). British Journal of Experimental Pathology, 52, 627–637.]

External links
Type strain of Mycobacterium gilvum at BacDive -  the Bacterial Diversity Metadatabase

Acid-fast bacilli
gilvum
Bacteria described in 1971